Chromosome 10 open reading frame 35 (c10orf35) is a gene that in humans, encodes for a protein-binding, transmembrane protein. The protein contains the domain of unknown function 4605 (DUF4605) which belongs to the protein family pfam15378. This gene is located at locus 10q22.1.

General characteristics 
The physical properties of the c10orf35 protein were analyzed, and the molecular weight was predicted to be 13.2 kdal, and the isoelectric point was predicted to be 11.5. The properties of DUF4605 were also analyzed, and the molecular weight was predicted to be 6.0 kdal. The isoelectric point was predicted to be 6.9, which is significantly less basic than the full protein.

Properties and structure 

This protein includes a highly conserved region between amino acids 1 and 19 discovered by MSA. DUF 4605 is located between amino acids 62 and 92. 
The secondary structure of the c10orf35 protein was predicted to consist of a β-sheet between amino acids 3 and 5, an α-helix between 61 and 72, and a transmembrane α-helix between 92 and 112.
The serine in position 62 can be phosphorylated to form a phosphoserine group.

Homology

Paralogs 
The protein of interest has a similar, paralogous domain found in c4orf32, which is conserved in mammals, birds, very few reptiles, and one amphibian.

Orthologs 
The protein coded for by c10orf35 has many orthologs found mainly in mammals, reptiles, few amphibians, one fish, and one invertebrate. Based on a multiple sequence alignment between representative orthologs, DUF 4605 and a second, highly conserved region were confirmed.

Clinical significance

Expression 

The c10orf35 protein has expression over the 75th percentile in the brain, spinal chord, and male reproductive organs. Within the male reproductive system, the RNA is found within the testis and prostate, while the protein is expressed in the epididymis. In the brain, the RNA is found in the cerebral cortex, while the protein is expressed ubiquitously throughout the brain.

Transcription regulation

Protein interactions 
The c10orf35 protein has been experimentally shown by Affinity Capture-MS to interact with 7 other proteins as shown below.

References 

Uncharacterized proteins